A projector is a device that projects an image on a surface.

Projector may also refer to:

Computing
 Projector PSA, a software and cloud-computing company
 Projector, a version control system used in the Macintosh Programmer's Workshop

Weaponry
 Projector, a type of mortar
 Livens Projector
 PIAT (Projector, Infantry, Anti Tank), British Second World War spigot mortar
 Holman Projector
 Northover Projector

Other uses
 Projector (album), a 1999 album by Dark Tranquillity
 Projector (patent), the original inventor to reduce an invention to practice
 In mathematics, a projection operator
The Projector, a Singaporean cinema chain

See also
 Corporate promoter or projector, e.g. in the phrase "railway projectors"
 Projection (disambiguation)